The following lists the top 25 (end of year) charting singles on the Australian Singles Charts, for the year of 1958. These were the best charting singles in Australia for 1958. The source for this year is the "Kent Music Report", known from 1987 onwards as the "Australian Music Report".

These charts are calculated by David Kent of the Kent Music Report and they are based on the number of weeks and position the records reach within the top 100 singles for each week.

source: David Kent's "Australian Chart Book 1940-1969"

Australian record charts
1958 in Australia
1958 record charts